The Midlands Express was one of the three flagship named passenger trains operated by Midland Mainline and now East Midlands Trains. This train ran along the Midland Main Line and was operated using an InterCity 125.

History
The Midlands Express name was introduced in 1999 and withdrawn from use by East Midlands Trains for the start of the December 2008 timetable. The last day the Midlands Express ran was 12 December 2008.

Stations Served

The north-bound Midlands Express was the 1625 train from London St Pancras to Sheffield and called at:
London St Pancras
Kettering
Leicester
Loughborough
Derby
Chesterfield
Sheffield

The south-bound Midlands Express was the 0705 train from Sheffield to London St Pancras and called at:
Sheffield
Chesterfield
Derby
Leicester
London St Pancras

Other named trains
Midland Mainline/East Midlands operated two other named trains at the time called:
The Master Cutler
The Robin Hood
East Midlands Railway still run services with these names after the franchise was handed over from East Midlands Trains.

See also
Midland Mainline
East Midlands Trains
InterCity 125

External links
East Midlands Trains website
National Rail Enquires website - main web portal for UK train fares, times and other travel information

Midland Express
Railway services introduced in 1999
1999 establishments in England